ACN may refer to:
 Accenture, professional services company, listed on the NYSE as ACN
 Achang language, a Tibeto-Burman language of China
 Achnasheen railway station, UK, National Rail code
 Acineta, a genus of orchid
 ACN Inc., multi-level marketing company providing telecommunications and other services
 Action Congress of Nigeria, political party of Nigeria
 Africa Cup of Nations, biennial football tournament
 Hockey Africa Cup of Nations, biennial field hockey tournament
Men's Hockey Africa Cup of Nations
Women's Hockey Africa Cup of Nations
 Agencia Carabobeña de Noticias, news agency, Valencia, Venezuela
 Agència Catalana de Notícies, news agency, Barcelona, Spain
 Agenzia per la Cybersicurezza Nazionale, Italian cybersecurity agency, Rome, Italy
 Aid to the Church in Need, Catholic charity in Königstein im Taunus, Germany
 Aircraft Classification Number, pavement load of an aircraft
 Algebraic chess notation, the standard notation for recording chess games
 American Collectibles Network, former name for Jewelry Television, US
 Andean Community of Nations, free trade area
 Anglican Communion Network, network of Anglican and Episcopalian dioceses and parishes
 ante Christum natum, seldom-used Latin equivalent of BC
 Architecture for Control Networks, network protocol for theatrical control
 Atlantis Cable News, fictional news channel on The Newsroom (American TV series)
 Australian Company Number, unique identifier for companies registered in Australia
 Ciudad Acuña International Airport, an airport in Ciudad Acuña, Mexico

Chemistry 
 Acetonitrile, CH3CN
 Acrylonitrile, CH2CHCN